Nicholas Dimitrakos (born May 21, 1979) is a Greek-American former professional ice hockey right winger who played in the National Hockey League (NHL) with the San Jose Sharks and Philadelphia Flyers.

Playing career
Dimitrakos was first introduced to hockey at age four by his uncle, and has loved and played it ever since. As a youth, he played in the 1993 Quebec International Pee-Wee Hockey Tournament with a minor ice hockey team from Beverly, Massachusetts. He graduated from Matignon High School (Cambridge, MA) in 1997. After graduation, Niko took a year's postgraduate course at Avon Old Farms (Avon, Ct), a prestigious hockey prep school.

Dimitrakos played his college hockey for the University of Maine Black Bears, helping the team win the 1999 NCAA Championship, and making the 1999 NCAA Championship All-Tournament Team. In his senior year, Dimitrakos led the team in points, with 20 goals and 31 assists in 43 games. While still a UMaine Black Bear, he was drafted by the San Jose Sharks, in the 5th round (155th overall) of the 1999 NHL Entry Draft.

Dimitrakos received his first NHL action toward the end of the 2002–03 NHL season. Sometimes playing on the same line as NHL star Teemu Selänne, he was credited with 6 goals and 7 assists in 21 games as a rookie. The following year, he logged 9 goals and 15 assists in 68 games. Despite his modest regular season statistics, he played well in the 2004 NHL playoffs, winning the first game of the first round against St. Louis with an overtime goal and subsequently helping San Jose advance to the Western Conference finals for the first time in franchise history.

2005–06 was a bit of a disappointing season for Dimitrakos, however, and on March 9, 2006, he was traded by the Sharks to the Philadelphia Flyers in exchange for a draft pick. He played in 24 games for the Flyers before being demoted to their AHL affiliate, the Philadelphia Phantoms, in October 2006. Following the 2006–07 season, Dimitrakos signed a one-year contract with the Ottawa Senators.

Prior to the 2008–09 season, Dimitrakos signed a one-year contract with Skellefteå in Sweden. Because of his Greek citizenship, he is not counted against the non-EU player limit.

In September 2011, he returned to play in North America - signing a PTO (Professional Tryout) contract with the Vancouver Canucks and attending their training camp. Dimitrakos was later released by the Vancouver Canucks on September 25, 2011. On October 5, 2011, Dimitrakos agreed to a 25-game PTO contract with the Wilkes-Barre/Scranton Penguins to start the 2011–12 season. After 21 games with Wilkes-Barre, Dimitrakos declined an extension to remain in the AHL and returned to his previous team in the DEL, Adler Mannheim, for the remainder of the 2011–12 season.

After contributing to Mannheim's offense to end the year, Dimitrakos signed on a one-year contract with rival DEL team Grizzly Adams Wolfsburg on July 18, 2012.

In January 2014, Dimitrakos signed a contract for the rest of the 2013–14 season with Finnish club, Ilves. He contributed with 7 points in 9 games before opting to retire from professional hockey after 12 seasons.

International play
Dimitrakos represent United States at the 2003 Men's World Ice Hockey Championships.

Career statistics

Regular season and playoffs

International

Awards and honors

References

External links
 

1979 births
Living people
Adler Mannheim players
American expatriate ice hockey players in Finland
American expatriate ice hockey players in Germany
American expatriate ice hockey players in Russia
American expatriate ice hockey players in Sweden
American expatriate ice hockey players in Switzerland
American men's ice hockey right wingers
Binghamton Senators players
Chicago Wolves players
Cleveland Barons (2001–2006) players
Grizzlys Wolfsburg players
Expatriate ice hockey players in Russia
HC CSKA Moscow players
Ice hockey players from Massachusetts
Ilves players
Maine Black Bears men's ice hockey players
Modo Hockey players
Sportspeople from Somerville, Massachusetts
Philadelphia Flyers players
Philadelphia Phantoms players
San Jose Sharks draft picks
San Jose Sharks players
SCL Tigers players
Skellefteå AIK players
Wilkes-Barre/Scranton Penguins players
AHCA Division I men's ice hockey All-Americans
NCAA men's ice hockey national champions